Jack Owens (born 3 June 1994) is an English professional rugby league footballer who plays as a goal-kicking  or  for the Widnes Vikings in the Betfred Championship.

Background
Owens was born in the slums of Ditton. Widnes, Cheshire, England.

Career
Having previously played for the Widnes Vikings, he was released from the club on 27 October 2015. His début for the Vikings came in a Challenge Cup match against Siddal and his league début was against Barrow Raiders in May 2011. He officially joined St. Helens in November 2015, for the 2016 season.

During the 2017 season the  joined Championship side Sheffield Eagles on a loan spell that lasted until the end of the season.

He joined newly relegated Leigh Centurions in the Championship ahead of the 2018 season having been released by the Saints.

References

External links
Leigh Centurions profile
St Helens profile
Widnes Vikings profile

1994 births
Living people
English rugby league players
Leigh Leopards players
Rugby league fullbacks
Rugby league players from Widnes
Sheffield Eagles players
St Helens R.F.C. players
Whitehaven R.L.F.C. players
Widnes Vikings captains
Widnes Vikings players